Vladislav Sychev (born 26 January 2002) is a Belarusian professional footballer who plays for Slutsk.

References

External links 
 
 

2002 births
Living people
People from Slutsk
Sportspeople from Minsk Region
Belarusian footballers
Association football midfielders
FC Slutsk players
FC Lokomotiv Gomel players